Sargodha Institute of Technology is a technical institute located in Sargodha, Punjab, Pakistan. It is owned by the Roman Catholic Diocese of Islamabad-Rawalpindi. It is affiliated with the Punjab Board of Technical Education.

It offers diploma in the following trades:

Electrical technology
Electronics technology
Mechanical technology
Civil technology
Refrigeration

The institute also offered Technical School Certificate (TSC), also known as matric tech.

Bishop Anthony Theodore Lobo upgraded the institute from a two-year certificate to a three-year Diploma of Associate Engineering (DAE) awarding institute. Plans are underway for converting the SIT into an Engineering College in the near future. Much of the expansion was made possible by a half million Euro aid granted to the SIT.

In 2009, the SIT was amongst the Christian institutions the Taliban sent letters to warning Christian leaders to convert to Islam or face dire consequences.

In 2010, the Principal was Robinson Daniel. When he took over in 2002 there were 33 students. With the improvements he introduced in 2018 there were over 1000 students.

In 2005, Robinson visited Germany financed by the Catholic aid organization Misereor. They also funded the purchase of new equipment. In addition he was able to ship back equipment donated from Germany, the Netherlands and Switzerland. The equipment in the institute had not been upgraded in over 40 years.

In 2019, the Catholic Church continues to subsidise the Institute despite its financial difficulties.

List of Principals 

 Rev. Fr. Gerard Verheij (MHM) (1958-1960)
 Rev. Fr. Joseph Van Erp (MHM) (1960-1962)
 Rev. Fr. Karel Heideman (MHM) (1962-1964)
 Rev. Fr. Clemens Van Pinxteren (MHM) (1964-1971)
 Rev. Fr. Ben Pex (MHM) (1971-1978)
 Rev. Fr. John Nevin (MHM) (1978-1980)
 Mr. Yousaf Malik (1980-2002)
 Mr. Robinson Daniel (2002-2018)
 Mr. Surmed Suleman (2018-2021 )
 Mr. Rohail Younas (2021- )

References

Catholic Church in Pakistan
Vocational education in Pakistan
Universities and colleges in Sargodha District